Kuru is a village in the Kuru CD block in the Lohardaga Sadar subdivision of the Lohardaga district in the Indian state of Jharkhand.

Geography

Location                                  
Kuru is located at

Area overview 
The map alongside shows an undulating plateau area with the hilly tract in the west and north-west. Three Bauxite mining centres are marked. It is an overwhelmingly rural district with 87.6% of the population living in the rural areas.

Note: The map alongside presents some of the notable locations in the district. All places marked in the map are linked in the larger full screen map.

Civic administration

Police station 
There is a police station at Kuru.

CD block HQ 
The headquarters of Kuru CD block are located at Kuru village.

Demographics 
According to the 2011 Census of India, Kuru had a total population of 6,676, of which 3,361 (50%) were males and 3,315 (50%) were females. Population in the age range 0–6 years was 1,093. The total number of literate persons in Kuru was 4,359 (78.08% of the population over 6 years).

(*For language details see Kuru block#Language and religion)

Education
Kasturba Gandhi Balika Vidyalaya is a Hindi-medium girls only institution established in 2006. It has facilities for teaching from class VI to class X. The school has a playground, a library with 700 books and has 5 computers for learning and teaching purposes.

Project Girls High School is a Hindi-medium girls only institution established in 1982. It has facilities for teaching in classes IX and X. The school has a library with 1,861 books.

Gandhi Memorial High School Maradi is a Hindi-medium coeducational institution established at Maradih in 1964. It has facilities for teaching from class IX to class XII. The school has a playground and a library with 1,200 books.

References 

Villages in Lohardaga district